UK Addiction Treatment Centres, also known as UKAT, was the largest private addiction treatment firm in the United Kingdom by patient volume in 2018. The organisation runs eight treatment facilities, each admitting on average 180 patients a month. The facilities provide treatment for alcohol, gambling, substance use disorders  and eating disorders.

In 2017, UKAT acquired Addiction Helper, an online addiction resource.

Services 
UKAT offers rehabilitative programmes with private or shared rooms for a 7-day, 14-day or 28-day treatment, including a medically assisted detox. Patients typically follow the 12-step program, alongside holistic treatments and recovery workshops.

The rehab centre locations include Sanctuary Lodge Essex, Primrose Lodge Surrey, Banbury Lodge Oxfordshire, Liberty House Bedfordshire, Recovery Lighthouse Sussex, Oasis Recovery Cheshire, Oasis Recovery West Yorkshire and Linwood House South Yorkshire.

Admission statistics 
In 2017, admissions for alcohol addiction reached record highs, and admissions for Xanax addictions doubled in 2018. Admissions for OTC drug addiction increased 22%. In 2018, UKAT has admitted 48 people for either codeine or benzodiazepine addiction, compared to just 26 for cannabis and 17 for gambling addiction.

Funding 
Councils have been receiving decreasing government funding since 2013. In 2017, councils received a 15.5% cut to alcohol and drug addiction services. UKAT received an investment from Eli Global in 2018 given increasing demand for addiction treatment and decreased public funding.

References

External links 
 UKAT Website

Addiction organisations in the United Kingdom
Alcohol and health
Drug and alcohol rehabilitation centers
Substance-related disorders